The Icahn School of Medicine at Mount Sinai (ISMMS or Mount Sinai), formerly the Mount Sinai School of Medicine, is a private medical school in New York City, New York, United States. The school is the academic teaching arm of the Mount Sinai Health System, which manages eight hospital campuses in the New York metropolitan area, including Mount Sinai Hospital and the New York Eye and Ear Infirmary.

Mount Sinai is ranked #11 among American medical schools by the 2023 U.S. News & World Report. In 2021, it was ranked 15th  in the country for biomedical research and leads the country in research funding from the National Institutes of Health for neuroscience (#2) and genetics (#2).  It attracted over $400 million in total NIH funding in 2021. Mount Sinai's faculty includes 23 elected members of the National Academies of Sciences, Engineering, and Medicine and 40 members of the American Society for Clinical Investigation.

In 2018, the MD program matriculated 140 students from 6,156 applicants. The median undergraduate GPA of matriculants is 3.84, and the median Medical College Admission Test score is in the 95th percentile. The Medical Scientist Training Program is currently training over 90 MD/PhD students. As one of the most selective medical schools in the U.S., Mount Sinai received 8,276 applications for approximately 140 MD and MD/PhD positions for the 2021–2022 academic year.

History
The first official proposal to establish of a medical school at Mount Sinai was made to the hospital's trustees in January 1958. The school's philosophy was defined by Hans Popper, Horace Hodes, Alexander Gutman, Paul Klemperer, George Baehr, Gustave L. Levy, and Alfred Stern, among others. Milton Steinbach was the school's first president.
 
Classes at Mount Sinai School of Medicine began in 1968, and the school soon became known as one of the leading medical schools in the U.S., as the hospital gained recognition for its laboratories, advances in patient care and the discovery of diseases. The City University of New York granted Mount Sinai's degrees. 

In 1999, Mount Sinai changed university affiliations from City University to New York University but did not merge its operations with the New York University School of Medicine. This affiliation change took place as part of the merger in 1998 of Mount Sinai and NYU medical centers to create the Mount Sinai–NYU Medical Center and Health System. In 2003, the partnership between the two dissolved.

In 2007, Mount Sinai Medical Center's boards of trustees approved the termination of the academic affiliation between Mount Sinai and NYU. In 2010, Mount Sinai was accredited by the Middle States Commission on Higher Education and became an independent degree-granting institution.

On November 14, 2012, it was announced that Mount Sinai School of Medicine would be renamed Icahn School of Medicine at Mount Sinai, following a US$200 million gift from New York businessman and philanthropist Carl Icahn.

In 2015, Mount Sinai announced partnerships with The Children's Hospital of Philadelphia as well as National Jewish Health, the nation's leading institutes for pediatric and pulmonary care respectively, leading to the creation of the Mount Sinai Children’s Heart Center and the Mount Sinai – National Jewish Health Respiratory Institute.

In March 2020, Elmhurst Hospital Center, the public hospital that serves as a major training site for Mount Sinai students and residents, was the epicenter of New York City's initial COVID-19 surge, with Mount Sinai house staff and faculty serving as the city's first frontline workers treating patients infected with coronavirus. Mount Sinai has since established itself at the forefront of research to understand and treat COVID-19, being named a lead site in a $470 million study to examine the long-term effects of COVID-19.

2019 lawsuit
In April 2019, the Icahn School was named in a lawsuit filed against Mount Sinai Health System and several employees of the Icahn School's Arnhold Institute for Global Health. The suit was filed by eight current and former employees for "age and sex discrimination as well as improper reporting to funding agencies, misallocation of funds, failing to obtain Institutional Review Board approval prior to conducting research in violation of Mount Sinai and federal guidelines, and failing properly to adhere to the guidelines of the Health Insurance Portability and Accountability Act or HIPAA."  The school denies the claims. More than 150 students at the Icahn School and more than 400 Icahn and Mount Sinai Health System faculty have signed letters, addressed to the Board of Trustees, calling on the system to investigate these allegations.

Academics

Mount Sinai's medical curriculum is based on the standard program of medical education in the United States: the first two years of study are confined to the medical sciences, the latter to the study of clinical sciences. The first and second years are strictly pass/fail; the third and fourth years feature clinical rotations at Mount Sinai Hospital (Manhattan) and Elmhurst Hospital Center, a major level 1 trauma center and safety-net hospital known for being situated in the "most ethnically diverse community in the world," serving an area of one million people with recent immigrants encompassing 112 different countries. Other clerkship and residency training sites include the New York Eye and Ear Infirmary, Mount Sinai Hospital of Queens, James J. Peters VA Medical Center in the Bronx, Mount Sinai West, Mount Sinai Morningside, and Mount Sinai Kravis Children's Hospital.

Student body 

Mount Sinai's four-pronged missions (quality education, patient care, research, and community service) follow the "commitment of serving science," and the majority of students take part in some aspect of community service. This participation includes The East Harlem Health Outreach Partnership, which was developed by the students of Mount Sinai to create a health partnership with the East Harlem community, providing quality health care, regardless of ability to pay, to uninsured residents of East Harlem.

Admissions 
Since 1989, Mount Sinai has featured a unique early-admissions program, The Humanities and Medicine Program, which guaranteed students admitted to the program a place in the medical school. These students, known colloquially as "HuMeds," applied during the fall of their sophomore year in college or university and did not take the Medical College Admission Test (MCAT). HuMeds made up about 25% of each year's ISMMS medical class. In 2013, the Humanities and Medicine program was expanded into the FlexMed program. Students admitted to the ISMMS via FlexMed can pursue any major and are required to take additional coursework in ethics, statistics, and health policy in lieu of or in addition to several of the traditional pre-med requirements. The school plans to recruit half of each incoming class through the FlexMed program.

Individual educational programs are accredited through the appropriate bodies, including but not limited to LCME, CEPH, ACCME and ACGME.

The tuition for 2020 was set at US$55,316.

Publications
The Annals of Global Health  was founded at Mount Sinai in 1934, then known as the Mount Sinai Journal of Medicine. Levy Library Press publishes The Journal of Scientific Innovation in Medicine.

Reputation
Mount Sinai was ranked 11th overall among research-based medical schools in the 2023 edition of U.S. News & World Report.
 The Mount Sinai Hospital, the teaching hospital of ISMMS, was listed in the 2022 edition of U.S. News & World Report Honor Roll, with multiple specialties ranked in the top 20 nationwide (geriatrics #1, cardiology #6, endocrinology #10, neurology & neurosurgery #10, orthopedics #14,  rehabilitation #14, gastroenterology #15, urology #16, pulmonology #20). The New York Eye and Ear Infirmary of Mount Sinai is ranked #14 in ophthalmology. 
Mount Sinai was ranked 8th among medical schools in the U.S. receiving NIH grants in 2022, and 2nd in research dollars per principal investigator among U.S. medical schools by the Association of American Medical Colleges (AAMC).
Mount Sinai was the first U.S. medical school to establish a Department of Geriatrics in 1982.
Mount Sinai's PhD program was ranked 3rd among 53 U.S. institutions in a survey conducted by Academic Analytics in 2008 and 7th on the organization's list of top 20 specialized research universities in biomedical health sciences.

Notable people

 Stuart A. Aaronson, internationally recognized cancer biologist and the Jane B. and Jack R. Aron Professor of  Neoplastic Diseases and chairman of Oncological Sciences
 Judith Aberg,  infectious disease researcher, George Baehr Professor of Clinical Medicine and Dean of System Operations for Clinical Sciences at the Icahn School of Medicine at Mount Sinai
 David H. Adams, co-creator of the Carpentier-McCarthy-Adams IMR ETlogix Ring and the Carpentier-Edwards Physio II degenerative annuloplasty ring
 Jacob M. Appel, novelist and short story author
 Michael Arthur, Vice-Chancellor of the University of Leeds
 Ambati Balamurali, youngest person ever to become a doctor, according to Guinness Book of Records
 Joshua B. Bederson, professor and chief of neurosurgery and the first neurosurgeon at Mount Sinai to receive an NIH R01 grant as principal investigator
 Solomon Berson, American physician and scientist whose discoveries, mostly together with Rosalyn Yalow, caused major advances in clinical biochemistry
 Tamir Bloom, Olympic epee fencer
 Michael J. Bronson, associate professor of orthopaedic surgery and creator of the Vision Total Hip System
 Michael L. Brodman, chair and professor of the department of obstetrics, gynecology and reproductive science and pioneer in the field of urogynecology
 Steven J. Burakoff, cancer specialist, author of both Therapeutic Immunology (2001) and Graft-Vs.-Host Disease: Immunology, Pathophysiology, and Treatment (1990), and the director of Mount Sinai Hospital's Cancer Institute
 Robert Neil Butler, physician, gerontologist, psychiatrist, Pulitzer Prize-winning author and the first director of the National Institute on Aging
 Alain F. Carpentier, hailed by the president of the American Association for Thoracic Surgery as the father of modern mitral valve repair
 Thomas C. Chalmers, known for his role in the development of the randomized controlled trial and meta-analysis in medical research
 Dennis S. Charney, current dean of the school and expert in the neurobiology and treatment of mood and anxiety disorders
 Sophie Clarke, winner of Survivor: South Pacific
 Michelle Copeland, D.M.D., M.D., assistant clinical professor of surgery, particularly known for her expertise on ankle liposuction and the treatment of gynecomastia
 Kenneth L. Davis, chairman and chief executive officer of Mount Sinai Medical Center, who developed what is now the most widely used tool to test the efficacy of treatments for Alzheimer's disease
 Charles DeLisi, former professor and chair of biomathematical sciences and professor of molecular biology who launched the Human Genome Project
 Burton Drayer, president of Mount Sinai Hospital (2003–2008) and president of the Radiological Society of North America (RSNA)
 Marta Filizola,  computational biophysicist, dean of the Graduate School of Biomedical Sciences
 Raja M. Flores, thoracic surgeon and chief of the Division of Thoracic Surgery, was instrumental in creating VATS lobectomy as the standard in the surgical treatment of lung cancer
 Sandra Fong, Olympic sport shooter
 Valentín Fuster, editor-in-chief of the Journal of the American College of Cardiology, the only cardiologist to receive all four major research awards from the world's four major cardiovascular organizations, and among the first to demonstrate that acute coronary events arise from small plaques
 Jeffrey Scott Flier, dean of the Harvard Medical School
 Scott L. Friedman, president of the American Association for the Study of Liver Diseases and pioneering researcher in the field of hepatic fibrosis
 Janice Gabrilove, hematologist-oncologist and inventor of patent describing initial isolation and characterization of human granulocyte colony-stimulating factor (G-CSF)
 Rivka Galchen, author
 Steven K. Galson, former Surgeon General of the United States
 Eric M. Genden, professor and chairman of the department of otolaryngology, who performed the first successful jaw transplant in New York State
 Isabelle M. Germano, professor of neurosurgery, neurology, oncological sciences pioneer of image-guided neurosurgery, radiosurgery, and gene therapy for brain tumors
 Stanley E. Gitlow, professor of medicine and former president of the American Society of Addiction Medicine
 Stuart Gitlow, former president of the American Society of Addiction Medicine and executive director of the Annenberg Physician Training Program in Addictive Diseases
 Alison Goate, director of the Loeb Center for Alzheimer's disease
 Randall B. Griepp, professor of cardiothoracic surgery who collaborated with Norman Shumway in the development of the first successful heart transplant procedures in the U.S.
 Jack Peter Green, founding professor and chairman of the department of pharmacology; expert in molecular pharmacology; established the first methods for measuring acetylcholine (ACh) in the brain, and the evidence for histamine as a neurotransmitter 
 Alon Harris, inventor and co-principal investigator on The Thessaloniki Eye Study, reportedly ophthalmology's largest population-based study
 Andrew C. Hecht, assistant professor of both orthopaedic surgery and neurosurgery and spine surgical consultant to the New York Jets, the New York Islanders and the New York Dragons
 Horace Hodes, former Herbert H. Lehman Professor and chairman of pediatrics
 Ravi Iyengar, professor and founder of the Iyengar Laboratory, Icahn School of Medicine at Mount Sinai
 Ethylin Wang Jabs, pediatrician and medical geneticist who identified the first human mutation in a homeobox-containing gene
 Andy S. Jagoda, professor and chair of the Department of Emergency Medicine and editor or author of 13 books, including The Good Housekeeping Family First Aid Book and the textbook Neurologic Emergencies
 René Kahn, neuropsychiatrist (schizophrenia, neuroimaging), Klingenstein Professor 
 Arnold Martin Katz, the first Philip J. and Harriet L. Goodhart Professor of Medicine (Cardiology), and author of Physiology of the Heart 
 Jeffrey P. Koplan, former director of the Centers for Disease Control and Prevention (CDC)
 Annapoorna Kini, associate professor of cardiology and co-author of Definitions of Acute Coronary Syndromes in Hurst's The Heart
 Daniel M. Labow, chief of the Division of Surgical Oncology and associate professor of surgery and surgical oncology, reputable for his work with cytoreductive and intraperitoneal hyperthermic chemoperfusion (HIPEC)
 Philip J. Landrigan, advocate of children's health
 Jeffrey Laitman, anatomist and physical anthropologist, distinguished professor of the Icahn School of Medicine at Mount Sinai, professor and director of the Center for Anatomy and Functional Morphology, professor of otolaryngology and professor of medical education
 Mark G. Lebwohl, the Sol and Clara Kest Professor and chairman of the department of dermatology and author of leading book on dermatologic therapy, Treatment of Skin Disease.
 I Michael Leitman, professor of surgery and dean for graduate medical education
 Ihor R. Lemischka, an internationally recognized stem cell biologist and stem cell research advocate
 Derek LeRoith, chief of the Division of Endocrinology, Diabetes and Bone Disease and director of the Metabolism Institute and the first to demonstrate the link between insulin-like growth factor-1 (IGF-1) and cancer
 Blair Lewis, clinical professor of gastroenterology and instrumental in developing the International Conference of Capsule Endoscopy's consensus statement for clinical application of the capsule endoscopy
 Barry A. Love, cardiologist specializing in pediatric and  congenital heart problems and director of Mount Sinai's Congenital Cardiac Catheterization Laboratory and director of the Pediatric Electrophysiology Service
 Henry Zvi Lothane, clinical professor, internationally recognized psychiatrist, psychoanalyst, and historian of psychoanalysis
 Michael L. Marin, professor and chairman of the department of surgery, the first in the U.S. to perform minimally invasive aortic aneurysm surgery and one of the first to perform a successful stent graft procedure
 Sean E. McCance, clinical professor of orthopaedics and listed as one of the "Best Doctors" for spinal fusion in Money magazine
 Roxana Mehran, interventional cardiologist
 Diane E. Meier, geriatrician and MacArthur Fellow, 2008
 Marek Mlodzik, chair of the Department of Molecular, Cell and Developmental Biology, professor of oncological sciences and ophthalmology
 David Muller, co-founder of the Mount Sinai Visiting Doctors Program, the largest academic physician home visiting program in the U.S.
 Eric J. Nestler, dean for academic and scientific affairs and director of the Friedman Brain Institute at the Icahn School of Medicine at Mount Sinai Medical Center in New York 
 Paul J. Kenny, chairman of the Nash Family Department of Neuroscience and director of the Drug Discovery Institute at the Icahn School of Medicine at Mount Sinai Medical Center in New York
 Herminia Palacio, class of 1987, Deputy Mayor of New York City under Bill de Blasio and CEO of the Guttmacher Institute
 Michael Palese, medical director of the department of urology and among the few surgeons in the U.S. trained in open, laparoscopic and robotic kidney procedures.
 Peter Palese, expert on influenza
 Giulio Maria Pasinetti, Saunders Family Chair and Professor of Neurology. Program director, Center for Molecular Integrative Neuroresilience at the Icahn School of Medicine
 Sean P. Pinney,  director of both the Advanced Heart Failure and Cardiac Transplant Program and the Pulmonary Hypertension Program
 John Puskas,  first totally thoracoscopic bilateral pulmonary vein isolation procedure and co-editor of ''State of the Art Surgical Coronary Revascularization the first textbook solely devoted to coronary artery surgery.
 Kristjan T. Ragnarsson, physiatrist and professor and chair of rehabilitation medicine with an international reputation in the rehabilitation of individuals with disorders of the central nervous system
 David L. Reich, president and chief operating officer of the Mount Sinai Hospital, chairman of the department of anesthesiology, and a pioneer in the use of electronic medical records
 Ronald Rieder, Vestermark Award recipient (American Psychiatric Association)
 John Rowe, CEO and executive chairman of Aetna from 2000 to 2006
 Elisa Rush Port, director and co-founder of the Dubin Breast Center at Mount Sinai Health System
 Eric Schadt, computational biologist, dean for precision medicine
 Alan L. Schiller, professor and chair of the department of pathology and member of the board of directors of the National Space Biomedical Research Institute
 Charles Schleien, pediatrician and medical researcher
 Bernd Schröppel, transplant nephrologist and assistant professor of nephrology
 Stuart C. Sealfon, identified the primary structure of the gonadotropin-releasing hormone receptor
 Aryeh Shander, recognized in 1997 by Time magazine as one of America's "Heroes of Medicine"
 René Simard, co-author of On Being Human: Where Ethics, Medicine and Spirituality Converge
 Joseph Sonnabend, physician, scientist and HIV/AIDS researcher, notable for pioneering community-based research, the propagation of safe sex to prevent infection, and an early and unconventional multifactorial model of AIDS
 Benjamin (Benji) Ungar (born 1986), NCAA-champion fencer
 I. Michael Leitman, surgeon and dean for graduate medical education, professor, Department of Medical Education, professor, Department of Surgery
 Upinder Singh Bhalla, neuroscientist, Shanti Swarup Bhatnagar laureate
 Samuel Waxman, Distinguished Service Professor of Oncological Sciences

References

External links
 Official website

 
Schools of medicine in New York City
Universities and colleges in Manhattan
Schools of public health in the United States
Private universities and colleges in New York City